Kambalpally is a small village located in Sadasivapet Mandal, Medak district in the Indian state of Telangana. It is part of Sangareddy Assembly Constituency and Medak Loksabha Constituency.

Villages in Medak district